Stephan Güsgen (born 26 March 1962 in Dormagen, North Rhine-Westphalia) is a retired West German swimmer, who specialized in sprint freestyle events. He represented West Germany at the 1988 Summer Olympics, and also became a member of and a resident athlete for TSV Bayer Dormagen, under his personal coach Jürgen Schmitz.

Gusgen competed only in the inaugural 50 m freestyle at the 1988 Summer Olympics in Seoul, where he finished fourteenth in the B final with a time of 23.55.

Shortly after the Games, Gusgen officially retired from swimming, and later worked as a sport medicine orthopedic surgeon at a local hospital in Dormagen.

References

1962 births
Living people
German male swimmers
Olympic swimmers of West Germany
Swimmers at the 1988 Summer Olympics
German male freestyle swimmers
People from Dormagen
Sportspeople from Düsseldorf (region)
Universiade medalists in swimming
Universiade bronze medalists for West Germany
20th-century German people
21st-century German people